Parkland Beach is a summer village in Alberta, Canada. It is located on the northern shore of Gull Lake, southeast of Rimbey.

Demographics 

In the 2016 Census of Population conducted by Statistics Canada, the Summer Village of Parkland Beach had a population of 153 living in 68 of its 213 total private dwellings, a  change from its 2011 population of 124.

See also 
List of communities in Alberta
List of summer villages in Alberta
List of resort villages in Saskatchewan

References

External links 

1984 establishments in Alberta
Ponoka County
Summer villages in Alberta